Return with Honor is a 1999 documentary film about U.S. prisoners of war during the Vietnam War. Among those profiled is Senator John McCain. It is narrated by Tom Hanks.

Directors Freida Lee Mock and Terry Sanders won the Best Film award at the 1999 Cleveland International Film Festival.

Home media
It was released on VHS on June 13, 2000, and on DVD on April 24, 2001.

References

External links

1999 films
1999 documentary films
American documentary films
American Experience
Documentary films about the Vietnam War
Films about shot-down aviators
Films directed by Terry Sanders
Films scored by Charles Bernstein
Vietnam War prisoner of war films
1990s English-language films
1990s American films